Christian Erin Hairston (born April 26, 1989) is a former American football offensive tackle. He was drafted by the Buffalo Bills in the fourth round of the 2011 NFL Draft. He played college football for the Clemson University Tigers.

High school career 
Hairston attended Carver High School in Winston-Salem, North Carolina. He was named First-team all-state by Associated Press while at Carver High School. He was named an all-region and all-conference as a junior and senior. He played his entire senior year as a 16-year-old facing much older opponents.

Considered a three-star recruit by Rivals.com, he was ranked the No.53 offensive tackle in the nation. He chose an offer from Clemson over Hampton and South Carolina State.

College career 
During his career, he played in 47 games, including 36 starts. He was named to the First-team All-ACC in 2011 as a senior.

Professional career

Buffalo Bills 
Hairston was drafted by the Buffalo Bills in the fourth round, 122nd overall of the 2011 NFL Draft. On August 26, 2013, he was placed on the reserve/non-football illness list.

San Diego / Los Angeles Chargers
Hairston signed with the San Diego Chargers on April 15, 2015.

On March 16, 2016, Hairston signed a two-year contract with the Chargers.

On September 20, 2017, Hairston was placed on the reserve/non-football illness list, ending his 2017 season.

References

External links 
 Los Angeles Chargers bio
 

1989 births
Living people
Players of American football from Winston-Salem, North Carolina
Clemson Tigers football players
American football offensive tackles
Buffalo Bills players
San Diego Chargers players
African-American players of American football
Los Angeles Chargers players
21st-century African-American sportspeople
20th-century African-American people